Dissosteira carolina,  the Carolina grasshopper, Carolina locust, black-winged grasshopper, road-duster or quaker, is a large, band-winged species of grasshopper which ranges widely in North America inhabiting weedy grasslands.

Description
Dissosteira carolina is one of the largest grasshoppers in North America at 32–58 mm in length and is a conspicuous species because of its size, colorful wings, and because it habitually flies over dirt roads and other bare ground. The spread wings  of the males measures 75 mm across while that of the females 80–102 mm. They can be identified by their brownish-black inner wings with yellow margins and a ridge running down the back and because of its large size and rather lazy bobbing flight it is often mistaken for a butterfly, especially the mourning cloak Nymphalis antiopa. The tegmina is light brown to tan to gray. They are colored in various shades from golden tan to gray to dark brown to greenish. They tend to be large and heavyset compared to African and West Asian locusts, though not as large or aggressive.

Distribution
Dissoteira carolina is found in North America in southern Canada from British Columbia to the Atlantic Coast and in the United States from the east Coast as far south as Florida, west to Idaho,

Biology
Dissosteira carolina feeds on both grasses and forbs but the actual composition of the diet depends on habitat. For example, in a disturbed site that had been reseeded with Bromus inermis and Agropyron cristatum, when  the adults' crop contents were examined 98 percent of the food consumed was Bromus inermis, by contrast, in a disturbed site that had not been reseeded but where weeds have colonised naturally, the adults' crop contents consisted of 33 percent native grasses and 64 percent weeds. In two-choice laboratory tests it was shown that D. carolina readily fed on Bromus tectorum, Bromus inermis, Pascopyrum smithii, wheat, barley, dandelion, and Bassia. As it has a wide geographical distribution and because it is known to be polyphagous D. carolina probably has many potential food plants.

In eastern Wyoming the hatching of the eggs of D. carolina may begin in early June or it may be delayed until late June. As oviposition occurs in late summer it is probable that the development of the nymph in the egg take place during the following spring. The nymphs emerge from the eggs over a period of at least two weeks to develop within a habitat of grass and weeds interspersed with patches of bare ground. In some areas, however, hatching may be extended over several weeks so that as many as four different instars coexist together. The nymphal period may be 40 days at an altitude of 4,700 feet and 55 days at an altitude of 6,100 feet in Wyoming. Laboratory reared nymphs kept at a constant temperature of 25 °C complete development in 52 days and 26 days at a constant temperature of 30 °C. D, carolina is thermophilic and prefers the hot, bare areas of its habitat.
 
Adult D. carolina appear earlier in the southern part of their range, e.g. during May in New Mexico and later in the more northerly parts of its range, e.g. July in northern Idaho. Once they acquire functional wings, they disperse extensively,  adults may fly distances of several miles or more, as they have been found in the center of large cities.

In the heat of the day, the male D. carolina take flight and hover, clicking their wings in a courtship display to attract females. Males court females by producing a calling signal by stridulating with hindlegs and wings, the hindlegs are used alternately to rub against the tegmen in a behaviour called alternate stridulation. The male sits horizontally on sunlit bare ground and may continue to stridulate for 5 minutes or more until he is successful in attracting a female. She moves towards the male and when she is close enough he approaches her and mounts. If he is acceptable to the female they copulate and may remain copulated for as long as 16 hours.

The females take a relatively long time to reach sexual maturity and it may take nine weeks from when the adults emerge to when ovipostion commences.

The female selects compacted bare ground which is exposed to the sun in which to oviposit, often the edge of a gravel or dirt road. She works her ovipositor to a depth of 35mm and deposits a large clutch of eggs which are enclosed in a sharply curved pod. After approximately 80 minutes, she extracts her ovipositor and then for up to three minutes she uses her hind tarsi to brush dust and debris over the oviposition site. The pod is  nearly 50mm long and usually contains more than 40 eggs.

D carolina is  a terrestrial, diurnal grasshopper, although they are attracted to lights on warm summer nights. Adults and nymphs shelter overnight and emerge to bask in the morning sun for two to three hours from roughly two hours after sunrise. After they have basked, the adults begin to walk and fly. Males are more active than the females which walk and fly far less than males but feed, groom, and rest more.  When temperatures reach hot ground temperatures of 43 °C and air temperature of 32 °C   the adults begin to stilt. As temperatures rise, they climb on to  vegetation until they are 2.5–7.5 mm above the substrate and face into the sun so that only the front of the head is exposed to the rays and the rest of the body is in shade. In the afternoon the adults bask again on bare ground from about 3 p.m. until 5 p.m. after which they walk or fly to seek shelter usually under canopies of grasses.

Predators
Dissosteira carolina are preyed on by various animals including many birds, pallid bats, spiders, praying mantis, and Sphex pensylvanicus wasps, which struggle to fly with such a heavy load.

Economic importance
Dissosteira carolina is a minor pest of grasses in rangeland. It is most common in disturbed areas where the main food is several species of weeds. In favorable habitats the populations may irrupt, dispersing and damaging crops. Disturbed areas reseeded with Bromus inermis may give rise to large populations of D. Carolina, which then fly to fields of autumn wheat where they can cause stand damage. There was an irruption in southern Saskatchewan in 1933 and 1934 which caused considerable damage to the region's crops. Damage has been recorded to tobacco in southern Ontario, to alfalfa and in 1935 D. carolina was especially destructive to Phaseolus vulgaris or Vicia faba in the vicinity of Flagstaff, Arizona. In Oklahoma damage  has been recorded in maize, sorghum, cotton and potato. To date there have been no detailed studies of the economic importance of D. carolina.

References

Oedipodinae
Grasshoppers described in 1758
Orthoptera of North America
Taxa named by Carl Linnaeus